S v Motau and Another is an important case in South African law. It was heard in the Transvaal Provincial Division on March 11, 1963, with judgment handed down on March 25. The judges were Ludorf J en Trollip J.

Judgment 
The case was an appeal from a conviction on a charge of arson, which requires by definition that the affected property be immovable. As it appeared that the state had failed to prove sufficiently that the complainant's "house" was immovable, the court substituted a conviction of malicious injury to property, although the appellants had been acquitted on such a charge.

See also 
 Arson
 Crime in South Africa
 Law of South Africa
 South African criminal law
 South African property law

References

Case law 
 S v Motau and Another 1963 (2) SA 521 (T).

Notes 

1963 in South African law
1963 in case law
Transvaal Provincial Division cases